Illinois Route 23 (IL 23) is a north–south state highway in northern Illinois. It runs from Illinois Route 116 in Pontiac north to U.S. Route 14 south of Harvard.

Illinois 23 was established in 1918 as one of the original 46 SBI routes. The routing of Illinois 23 has not changed since its establishment.

Route description
Illinois 23 is a major arterial route in rural central and north-central Illinois. It is a parallel to the Interstate 39/U.S. Route 51 combination approximately 20 miles (32 km) to the west.

The road starts near downtown Pontiac and runs as the main highway north, intersecting with Interstate 55 and former U.S. Route 66. From this point, Illinois 23 continues as a 2-lane highway, turning west and running through Cornell. After that, it turns back north to travel through the middle of Streator, where the route splits to follow two different one-way streets (Park Street and Bloomington Street). Route 23 continues through Grand Ridge to Ottawa, where the road follows 1st Ave and State street, to form a concurrent with Illinois Route 71—Illinois 71 across the Illinois River.  The highway once again splits into two one-way streets (Columbus and LaSalle Streets) through downtown Ottawa, until a block south of its junction with 
U.S. Route 6, where Illinois 71 departs toward the east.

North of Ottawa, Illinois 23 has a full diamond interchange with Interstate 80. Illinois 23 has two additional concurrencies with U.S. Route 34 and U.S. Route 52, though no notable cities are present between Ottawa and DeKalb. Illinois 23 runs under Interstate 88 with no interchange, though access is available via Fairview Drive to two parallel roads with interchanges (Peace Road and Annie Glidden Road). Between DeKalb and Sycamore, Illinois 23 has four lanes. In Sycamore, Illinois 23 briefly overlaps Illinois Route 64. After one final concurrency at Illinois Route 72 near Genoa, Illinois 23 has an interchange with Interstate 90. It intersects U.S. Route 20 and the western terminus of Illinois Route 176 in Marengo, and terminates south of Harvard at U.S. Route 14.

Major intersections

Notes
 In downtown DeKalb, Route 23 (the main north–south street) intersects as 4th Street with Illinois Route 38 (the main east–west street) at a railroad crossing, as two Union Pacific tracks pass through the crossing. Trains routinely bring traffic in DeKalb to a halt.

References

External links

Illinois Highway Ends: Illinois Route 23

023
DeKalb, Illinois
Transportation in Livingston County, Illinois
Transportation in LaSalle County, Illinois
Transportation in DeKalb County, Illinois
Transportation in McHenry County, Illinois